Monomorium effractor is a species of ant in the genus Monomorium. It is native to India.

References

Insects of India
effractor
Hymenoptera of Asia
Insects described in 1987
Taxonomy articles created by Polbot